"Moments" is a song by German-Colombian producer Freddy Verano featuring Sam Smith, released as a single on 8 May 2015. It was included on Smith's 2015 album, The Lost Tapes – Remixed, which features their early recordings. The original version of the song, titled "Momentarily Mine", was recorded by Smith in 2008.

Background
In 2008, Smith had signed a deal with Venus & Marc Music, a small UK independent label. They started recording songs for their debut album and one of them was a piano ballad, "Momentarily Mine". In 2009, a German dance label Kosmo Records approached Venus & Mars Music and signed a worldwide license deal for remixing Smith's entire album when it was eventually released. However in 2010, Smith decided to end their association with Venus & Marc Music and walked away from the deal. When Smith became a marketable name, Kosmo Records used their rights to remix any of the tracks from their unreleased album. After "When It's Alright" a year before, they did it with "Momentarily Mine" in 2015. The song was now simply titled "Moments" and promoted under the name Freddy Verano featuring Sam Smith. It was radically transformed from a piano ballad to a house track. The music video for "Moments" was released on 30 January 2015.

Track listing
Digital single
"Moments" (Radio Edit) – 3:21
"Moments" (Extended Mix) – 6:18

German digital EP
"Moments" (Radio Edit) – 3:21
"Moments" (Extended Mix) – 6:18
"Moments" (Tragic Johnson Radio Edit) – 3:27
"Moments" (Tragic Johnson Club Edit) – 5:10
"Moments" (Ike's Retro Radio Mix) – 3:07

Charts

Release history

Momentarily Mine

The original 2008 version of the song by Sam Smith, "Momentarily Mine" was released by Flipbook Music on 4 August 2016.

Track listing
Digital single
"Momentarily Mine" – 2:38

Release history

References

2015 singles
Sam Smith (singer) songs